Streptomyces coeruleoprunus is a bacterium species from the genus of Streptomyces. Streptomyces coeruleoprunus produces neomycin B.

See also 
 List of Streptomyces species

References

Further reading

External links
Type strain of Streptomyces coeruleoprunus at BacDive -  the Bacterial Diversity Metadatabase

coeruleoprunus
Bacteria described in 1986